The 2010 congressional elections in Kentucky were held on November 2, 2010, and determined who would represent the Commonwealth of Kentucky in the United States House of Representatives. Kentucky has six seats in the House, apportioned according to the 2000 United States Census. Representatives are elected for two-year terms; the elected served in the 112th Congress from January 3, 2011 until January 3, 2013. As of 2021, this is the last time the Democrats won more than one congressional district in Kentucky.

Overview

By district
Results of the 2010 United States House of Representatives elections in Kentucky by district:

District 1

Running for his ninth term in this conservative district based in western Kentucky, incumbent Republican Congressman Ed Whitfield faced a trivial challenge from Democratic candidate Charles Hatchett. As expected, Congressman Whitfield was overwhelmingly re-elected to another term in Congress.

Results

District 2

Though incumbent Republican Congressman Brett Guthrie was elected by a slim margin in 2008, he did not face a serious challenge in his bid for a second term from Democratic candidate Ed Marksberry. As was expected, Congressman Guthrie was re-elected in a landslide in this conservative district based in west-central Kentucky.

Results

District 3

Campaign
Two-term Democratic incumbent Congressman John Yarmuth has represented this liberal-leaning district based in metro Louisville since he was first elected in 2006. Yarmuth defeated Republican Congresswoman Anne Northup in 2006, and defeated her again in a rematch in 2008, but she declined to run again in 2010. Instead, Congressman Yarmuth faced Republican candidate Todd Lally, an airline pilot and a failed State House candidate.

Lally attacked Yarmuth for being a "liberal follower" of Nancy Pelosi who voted with her "San Francisco agenda 99 percent of the time," charges that Yarmuth called "ignorant and irresponsible." The Courier-Journal, the largest newspaper in the district, strongly endorsed Congressman Yarmuth in his bid for re-election, and in the end, Yarmuth was able to best Lally by a surprisingly wide margin.

Polling

Results

District 4

Campaign
This conservative district based in northern Kentucky, including some of metropolitan Cincinnati, has been represented by Republican Congressman Geoff Davis since he was first elected in 2004. Seeking a fourth term, Congressman Davis faced Democratic candidate John Waltz, an Iraq War veteran in the general election, who was not given much of a chance given the conservative nature of the district. As expected, Davis was overwhelmingly re-elected.

Results

District 5

Campaign
Republican Congressman Hal Rogers, the dean of the Kentucky congressional delegation, has represented this conservative district based in eastern Kentucky, faced Democratic candidate Jim Holbert in his bid for a sixteenth term. Holbert had previously run against Congressman Rogers in 2008 as an independent candidate.  However, Holbert was defeated by Rogers in a landslide for the second time in the general election.

Results

District 6

Campaign
This conservative district based around the Lexington metropolitan area has been represented by incumbent Democratic Congressman Ben Chandler since he was first elected in a 2004 special election. This year, Chandler faced a serious threat to bid for a fifth term in Congress from Republican attorney Andy Barr.

In the general election, both candidates started releasing television ads in August 2010, with Barr attacking Chandler for being part of "politics as usual" while Chandler countered by proclaiming his independence, saying, "If the Republican Party is going to suggest that I'm a tool of somebody else, there is no basis in fact for that." As election day grew nearer, both sides ramped up attacks, with the Democratic Congressional Campaign Committee releasing an ads slamming Barr for his criminal record and plans to privatize Social Security. Barr, meanwhile, attacked Chandler for supporting gun control, even though Chandler was endorsed in his bid for re-election by the National Rifle Association. Polls predicted a tight race, and on election night, those polls were vindicated; no media organization called the race that night because Chandler led Barr by only a few hundred votes. It was only a few days later that Chandler was proclaimed the winner.

Polling

Results

References

External links
Kentucky State Board of Elections
U.S. Congress Candidates for Kentucky at Project Vote Smart

Kentucky
2010
2010 Kentucky elections